Thomas James Stanislaus Harbison (8 November 1864 – 22 November 1930) was an Irish nationalist politician.

He was born in Cookstown, County Tyrone, to John Harbison, a general merchant, and Isabella Daly.

Harbison studied at St Malachy's College in Belfast. He became active in the Irish Parliamentary Party, acting from 1906 until 1910 as the election agent for William Redmond and Tom Kettle. In 1911, he was elected to Tyrone County Council.

After attending the Irish Convention, he was elected to Westminster at the 1918 East Tyrone by-election, after Redmond resigned it to contest Waterford City.  At the 1918 general election, Harbison was elected in North East Tyrone.

At the 1921 Northern Ireland general election, Harbison was elected on an abstentionist platform in Fermanagh and Tyrone. In 1922, he was elected in the Westminster constituency of Fermanagh and Tyrone along with Cahir Healy for the Nationalist Party. With majorities of more than 6,000 votes over the Unionist candidates, their elections were seen as a plebiscite on the issue of the Partition of Ireland. He stood down from the Westminster seat at the 1924 election, and in 1927 took his seat at Stormont. In 1929, he stood down from his Stormont seat, but was again elected to Westminster, serving until his death a year later.

References
Northern Ireland Parliament Elections Results: Biographies

Notes

External links 
 
 

1864 births
1930 deaths
19th-century Irish people
Members of Tyrone County Council
Irish Parliamentary Party MPs
Members of the House of Commons of Northern Ireland 1921–1925
Members of the House of Commons of Northern Ireland 1925–1929
Members of the Parliament of the United Kingdom for County Tyrone constituencies (1801–1922)
Members of the Parliament of the United Kingdom for Fermanagh and Tyrone (1922–1950)
Nationalist Party (Ireland) members of the House of Commons of Northern Ireland
People from Cookstown
UK MPs 1910–1918
UK MPs 1918–1922
UK MPs 1922–1923
UK MPs 1923–1924
UK MPs 1929–1931
Members of the House of Commons of Northern Ireland for Fermanagh and Tyrone